St. Augustine is a city in and the county seat of St. Johns County on the Atlantic coast of northeastern Florida. Founded in 1565 by Spanish explorers, it is the oldest continuously inhabited European-established settlement in what is now the contiguous United States.

St. Augustine was founded on September 8, 1565, by Spanish admiral Pedro Menéndez de Avilés, Florida's first governor. He named the settlement "San Agustín", as his ships bearing settlers, troops, and supplies from Spain had first sighted land in Florida eleven days earlier on August 28, the feast day of St. Augustine. The city served as the capital of Spanish Florida for over 200 years. It was designated as the capital of British East Florida when the colony was established in 1763; Great Britain returned Florida to Spain in 1783.

Spain ceded Florida to the United States in 1819, and St. Augustine was designated the capital of the Florida Territory upon ratification of the Adams–Onís Treaty in 1821. The Florida National Guard made the city its headquarters that same year. The territorial government moved and made Tallahassee the capital of Florida in 1824.

St. Augustine is part of Florida's First Coast region and the Jacksonville metropolitan area. Since the late 19th century, St. Augustine's distinctive historical character has made the city a tourist attraction. The old Spanish fort, the walls of which are made of coquina, continues to attract tourists.

History

Founding by Pedro Menéndez de Avilés

Founded in 1565 by the Spanish conquistador Pedro Menéndez de Avilés, St. Augustine is the oldest continuously occupied settlement of European origin in the contiguous United States. It is the second-oldest continuously inhabited city of European origin in United States territory after San Juan, Puerto Rico (founded in 1521). In 1560, King Philip II of Spain appointed Menéndez as Captain General, and his brother Bartolomé Menéndez as Admiral, of the Fleet of the Indies. Thus Pedro Menéndez commanded the galleons of the great Armada de la Carrera, or Spanish Treasure Fleet, on their voyage from the Caribbean and Mexico to Spain, and determined the routes they followed.

In early 1564 he asked permission to go to Florida to search for La Concepcion, the galeon Capitana, or flagship, of the New Spain fleet commanded by his son, Admiral Juan Menéndez. The ship had been lost in September 1563 when a hurricane scattered the fleet as it was returning to Spain, at the latitude of Bermuda off the coast of South Carolina. The crown repeatedly refused his request.

The crown approached Menéndez to fit out an expedition to Florida on the condition that he explore and settle the region as King Philip's adelantado, and eliminate the Huguenot French, whom the Catholic Spanish considered to be dangerous heretics.

Menéndez was in a race to reach Florida before the French captain Jean Ribault, who was on a mission to secure Fort Caroline. On August 28, 1565, the feast day of St. Augustine of Hippo, Menéndez's crew finally sighted land; the Spaniards continued sailing northward along the coast from their landfall, investigating every inlet and plume of smoke along the shore. On September 4, they encountered four French vessels anchored at the mouth of a large river (the St. Johns), including Ribault's flagship, La Trinité. The two fleets met in a brief skirmish, but it was not decisive. Menéndez sailed southward and landed again on September 8, formally declared possession of the land in the name of Philip II, and officially founded the settlement he named San Agustín (Saint Augustine). Father Francisco López de Mendoza Grajales, the chaplain of the expedition, celebrated the first Thanksgiving Mass on the grounds. The formal Franciscan outpost, Mission Nombre de Dios, was founded at the landing point, perhaps the first mission in what would become the continental United States. 

The mission served nearby villages of the Mocama, a Timucua group, and was at the center of an important chiefdom in the late 16th and 17th century. The settlement was built in the former Timucua village of Seloy; this site was chosen for its strategic location facing the waterways of St. Augustine bay with their abundant resources, an eminently suitable site for water communications and defense.
 
A French attack on St. Augustine was thwarted by a violent squall that ravaged the French naval forces. The Spanish easily overwhelmed the lightly defended French garrison, which had been left with only a skeleton crew of 20 soldiers and about 100 others, killing most of the men and sparing about 60 women and children. The bodies of the victims were hung in trees with the inscription: "Hanged, not as Frenchmen, but as "Lutherans" (heretics)." Menéndez renamed the fort San Mateo and marched back to St. Augustine, where he discovered that the shipwrecked survivors from the French ships had come ashore to the south of the settlement. A Spanish patrol encountered the remnants of the French force, and took them prisoner. Menéndez accepted their surrender, but then executed all of them except a few professing Catholics and some Protestant workers with useful skills, at what is now known as Matanzas Inlet (Matanzas is Spanish for "slaughters"). The site is very near the national monument Fort Matanzas, built in 1740–1742 by the Spanish.

Invasions by pirates and enemies of Spain

Succeeding governors of the province maintained a peaceful coexistence with the local Native Americans, allowing the isolated outpost of St. Augustine some stability for a few years. On May 28 and 29, 1586, soon after the Anglo-Spanish War began between England and Spain, the English privateer Sir Francis Drake sacked and burned St. Augustine. The approach of his large fleet obliged Governor Pedro Menéndez Márquez and the townspeople to evacuate the settlement. When the English got ashore, they seized some artillery pieces and a royal strongbox containing gold ducats (which was the garrison payroll). The killing of their sergeant major by the Spanish rearguard caused Drake to order the town razed to the ground.

In 1609 and 1611, expeditions were sent out from St. Augustine against the English colony at Jamestown. In the second half of the 17th century, groups of Indians from the colony of Carolina conducted raids into Florida and killed the Franciscan priests who served at the Catholic missions. Requests by successive governors of the province to strengthen the presidio’s garrison and fortifications were ignored by the Spanish Crown which had other priorities in its vast empire. The charter of 1663 for the new Province of Carolina, issued by King Charles II of England, was revised in 1665, claiming lands as far southward as 29 degrees north latitude, about 65 miles south of the existing settlement at St. Augustine.

The English buccaneer Robert Searle sacked St. Augustine in 1668, after capturing some Spanish supply vessels bound for the settlement and holding their crews at gun point while his men hid below decks. Searle was retaliating for the Spanish destruction of the settlement of New Providence in the Bahamas. Searle and his men killed sixty people and pillaged public storehouses, churches and houses. This raid and the establishment of the English settlement at Charles Town spurred the Spanish Crown to finally acknowledge the vulnerability of St. Augustine to foreign incursions and strengthen the city's defenses. In 1669, Queen Regent Mariana ordered the Viceroy of New Spain to disburse funds for the construction of a permanent masonry fortress, which began in 1672. Before the fortress was completed, French buccaneers Michel de Grammont and Nicolas Brigaut planned an ill-fated attack in 1686 which was foiled: their ships were run aground, Grammont and his crew were lost at sea, and Brigaut was captured ashore by Spanish soldiers. The Castillo de San Marcos was completed in 1695, not long before an attack by James Moore's forces from Carolina in November, 1702. Failing to capture the fort after a siege of 58 days, the British set St. Augustine ablaze as they retreated.

In 1738, the governor of Spanish Florida, Manuel de Montiano, ordered a settlement be constructed two miles north of St. Augustine for the growing Free Black community established by fugitive slaves who had escaped into Florida from the Thirteen Colonies. This new community, Fort Mose, would serve as a military outpost and buffer for St. Augustine, as the men accepted into Fort Mose had enlisted in the colonial militia and converted to Catholicism in exchange for their freedom.

In 1740, however, St. Augustine was again besieged, this time by the governor of the British colony of Georgia, General James Oglethorpe, who was also unable to take the fort.

Loyalist haven under British rule

The 1763 Treaty of Paris, signed after Great Britain's victory over France and Spain during the Seven Years' War, ceded Florida to Great Britain in exchange for the return of Havana and Manila. The vast majority of Spanish colonists in the region left Florida for Cuba, Florida became Great Britain's fourteenth and fifteenth North American colonies, and because of the political sympathies of its British inhabitants, St. Augustine became a Loyalist haven during the American Revolutionary War.

After the mass exodus of St. Augustinians, Great Britain sought to repopulate its new colony. The London Board of Trade advertised 20,000-acre lots to any group that would settle in Florida within ten years, with one resident per 100 acres. Pioneers who were "energetic and of good character" were given 100 acres of land and 50 additional acres for each family member they brought. Under Governor James Grant, almost three million acres of land were granted in East Florida alone. Second stories were added to existing Spanish homes and new houses were built. Cattle ranching and plantation agriculture began to thrive.

During the twenty-year period of British rule, Britain took command of both the Castillo de San Marcos (renamed Fort St. Mark) and of Fort Matanzas. They permanently stationed a small group of men at Fort Matanzas. Once war broke out, loyalist St. Augustine residents burned effigies of Patriots Samuel Adams and John Hancock in the plaza. Fort St. Mark became a training and supply base, as well a prisoner-of-war camp where three signers of the Declaration of Independence and South Carolina's lieutenant governor Christopher Gadsden were held. Local militia composed of Florida, Georgia, and Carolina inhabitants formed the East Florida Rangers in 1776 and were reorganized to form the King's Rangers in 1779. Spanish General Bernardo de Gálvez, harassed the British in West Florida and captured Pensacola. Fears that the Spanish would then move to capture St. Augustine, however, proved unfounded.

The 1783 Treaty of Paris, which recognized the independence of the Thirteen Colonies as the United States, ceded Florida back to Spain and returned the Bahamas to Britain. As a result, some of the town's Spanish residents returned to St Augustine. Refugees from Dr. Andrew Turnbull's troubled colony in New Smyrna had fled to St. Augustine in 1777, made up the majority of the city's population during the period of British rule, and remained when the Spanish Crown took control again. This group was, and still is, referred to locally as "Menorcans", even though it also included settlers from Italy, Corsica and the Greek islands.

Second Spanish period

During the Second Spanish period (1784–1821) of Florida, Spain was dealing with invasions of the Iberian peninsula by Napoleon's armies in the Peninsular War, and struggled to maintain a tenuous hold on its territories in the western hemisphere as revolution swept South America. The royal administration of Florida was neglected, as the province had long been regarded as an unprofitable backwater by the Crown. The United States, however, considered Florida vital to its political and military interests as it expanded its territory in North America, and maneuvered by sometimes clandestine means to acquire it. On October 5, 1811, a hurricane hit St. Augustine that caused extensive damage to the city. The damage was further exacerbated by the economic situation of Spanish Florida. The Adams–Onís Treaty, negotiated in 1819 and ratified in 1821, ceded Florida and St. Augustine, still its capital at the time, to the United States.

Territory of Florida

According to the Adams–Onís Treaty, the United States acquired East Florida and absolved Spain of $5 million of debt. Spain renounced all claims to West Florida and the Oregon Country. Andrew Jackson returned to Florida in 1821, upon ratification of the treaty, and established a new territorial government. Americans from older plantation societies of Virginia, Georgia, and the Carolinas began to move to the area. West Florida was quickly consolidated with East and the new capital of Florida became Tallahassee, halfway between the old capitals of St. Augustine and Pensacola, in 1824.

Once many Americans had begun to immigrate to the new territory, it became apparent that there would be continued skirmishes with local Creek and Miccosukee peoples and white settlers encroaching on their land. The United States government favored removal policies, but local indigenous groups in Florida refused to leave without fighting. The nineteenth century saw three Seminole Wars. In 1823, territorial governor William Duval and James Gadsden signed the Treaty of Moultrie Creek, forcing Seminoles onto a four million acre reservation in central Florida. The Second Seminole War (1835–1842) was the longest war of Indian removal and resulted when the United States government attempted to move the Seminole people from Central Florida to a Creek reservation west of the Mississippi River. As a result of the Seminole War, Seminole prisoners, including the prominent leader Osceola, were held captive in the Castillo de San Marcos, renamed Fort Marion after General Francis Marion, who fought in the American Revolution, in the 1830s.

By 1840, the territory's population had reached 54,477 people. Half the population were enslaved Africans. Steamboats were popular on the Apalachicola and St. Johns River and there were several plans for railroad construction. The territory south of present-day Gainesville was sparsely populated by whites.

In 1845 the Florida Territory was admitted into the Union as the State of Florida.

Civil War 

On January 7, 1861, only three days before Florida would secede and join the Confederacy, a group of 125 Florida militia marched on Fort Marion. The fort was guarded by a single sergeant, who surrendered the fort after being provided with a receipt. Gen. Robert E. Lee, who was commander of coastal defenses at the time, ordered that the fort's cannons be removed and sent to more strategic locations, such as Fernandina and the mouth of the St. Johns River.

The town raised a militia unit, known as the Florida Independent Blues or the Saint Augustine Blues. They were soon joined by the Milton Guard, another militia unit.

In an effort to help blockade runners avoid capture, the Confederate government ordered all lighthouses to be extinguished. In St. Augustine, the customhouse officer, Paul Arnau, organized the "Coastal Guard," a group who worked to disable the lighthouses along Florida's east coast. They started by removing and hiding the lenses from the St. Augustine Light before moving south. After successfully dismantling the lighthouses at Cape Canaveral, Jupiter Inlet, and Key Biscayne, Arnau returned to St. Augustine. He would then serve as mayor from 1861 until early 1862, just before the Federals took over the city.

The Confederate authorities remained in control of St. Augustine for fourteen months, although it was barely defended. The Union conducted a blockade of shipping. In 1862 Union troops gained control of St. Augustine and controlled it through the rest of the war. With the economy already suffering, many residents fled.

Henry Flagler and the railroad

Henry Flagler, a co-founder with John D. Rockefeller of the Standard Oil Company, spent the winter of 1883 in St. Augustine and found the city charming, but considered its hotels and transportation systems inadequate. He had the idea to make St. Augustine a winter resort for wealthy Americans from the north, and to bring them south he bought several short line railroads and combined these in 1885 to form the Florida East Coast Railway. He built a railroad bridge over the St. Johns River in 1888, opening up the Atlantic coast of Florida to development.

Flagler finished construction in 1887 on two large ornate hotels in the city, the 450-room Hotel Ponce de Leon and the 250-room Hotel Alcazar. The next year, he purchased the Casa Monica Hotel (renaming it the Cordova Hotel) across the street from both the Alcazar and the Ponce de Leon. His chosen architectural firm, Carrère and Hastings, radically altered the appearance of St. Augustine with these hotels, giving it a skyline and beginning an architectural trend in the state characterized by the use of the Spanish Renaissance Revival and Moorish Revival styles. With the opening of the Ponce de Leon in 1888, St. Augustine became the winter resort of American high society for a few years.

When Flagler's Florida East Coast Railroad was extended southward to Palm Beach and then Miami in the early 20th century, the wealthy stopped in St. Augustine en route to the southern resorts. Wealthy vacationers began to customarily spend their winters in South Florida, where the climate was warmer and freezes were rare. St. Augustine nevertheless still attracted tourists, and eventually became a destination for families traveling in automobiles as new highways were built and Americans took to the road for annual summer vacations. The tourist industry soon became the dominant sector of the local economy.

Civil Rights Movement 

In late 1963, nearly a decade after the Supreme Court ruling in Brown v. Board of Education that segregation of schools was unconstitutional, African Americans were still trying to get St. Augustine to integrate the public schools in the city. They were also trying to integrate public accommodations, such as lunch counters, and were met with arrests and Ku Klux Klan violence. Local college students held non-violent protests throughout the city, including sit-ins at the local Woolworth's, picket lines, and marches through the downtown. These protests were often met with police violence. Homes of African Americans were firebombed, black leaders were assaulted and threatened with death, and others were fired from their jobs.

In the spring of 1964, St. Augustine civil rights leader Robert Hayling asked the Southern Christian Leadership Conference (SCLC) and its leader Martin Luther King Jr. for assistance. From May until July 1964, King and Hayling, along with Andrew Young, organized marches, sit-ins, and other forms of peaceful protest in St. Augustine. Hundreds of black and white civil rights supporters were arrested, and the jails were filled to capacity. At the request of Hayling and King, white civil rights supporters from the North, including students, clergy, and well-known public figures, came to St. Augustine and were arrested together with Southern activists.

St. Augustine was the only place in Florida where King was arrested; his arrest there occurred on June 11, 1964, on the steps of the Monson Motor Lodge's restaurant. The demonstrations came to a climax when a group of black and white protesters jumped into the hotel's segregated swimming pool. In response to the protest, James Brock, the manager of the hotel and the president of the Florida Hotel & Motel Association, poured what he claimed to be muriatic acid into the pool to burn the protesters. Photographs of this, and of a policeman jumping into the pool to arrest the protesters, were broadcast around the world.

The Ku Klux Klan responded to these protests with violent attacks that were widely reported in national and international media. Popular revulsion against the Klan and police violence in St. Augustine generated national sympathy for the black protesters and became a key factor in Congressional passage of the Civil Rights Act of 1964, leading eventually to passage of the Voting Rights Act of 1965, both of which provided federal enforcement of constitutional rights.

St. Augustine's historically Black college, now Florida Memorial University, felt itself unwelcome in St. Augustine, and departed in 1968 for a new campus near Opa-locka in Dade County.

Modern St. Augustine

In 1965, St. Augustine celebrated the 400th anniversary of its founding, and jointly with the State of Florida, inaugurated a program to restore part of the colonial city. The Historic St. Augustine Preservation Board was formed to reconstruct more than thirty-six buildings to their historical appearance, which was completed within a few years. When the State of Florida abolished the Board in 1997, the City of St. Augustine assumed control of the reconstructed buildings, as well as other historic properties including the Government House. In 2010, the city transferred control of the historic buildings to UF Historic St. Augustine, Inc., a direct support organization of the University of Florida.

In 2015, St. Augustine celebrated the 450th anniversary of its founding with a four-day long festival and a visit from Felipe VI of Spain and Queen Letizia of Spain.

On October 7, 2016 Hurricane Matthew caused widespread flooding in downtown St. Augustine.

Geography and climate 

St. Augustine is located at  (29.8946910, −81.3145170).
Access to the Atlantic Ocean is via the St. Augustine Inlet of the Matanzas River.

St. Augustine has a humid subtropical climate (Cfa) typical of the Gulf and South Atlantic states. The low latitude and coastal location give the city a mostly warm and sunny climate. Unlike much of the contiguous United States, St. Augustine's driest time of year is winter. The hot and wet season extends from May through October, while the cool and dry season extends November through April.

In summer, highs are in the 80s to 90s and lows are in the 70s. The Bermuda High pumps in hot and unstable tropical air from the Bahamas and Gulf of Mexico, which help create the daily thundershowers that are typical in summer months. Intense but very brief downpours are common in summer in the city. Fall and spring are warm and sunny with highs from 74 °F to 87 °F and lows in the 50s to 70s.

In winter, St. Augustine has generally mild and sunny weather typical of the Florida peninsula. The coolest months are from December through February, with highs from 67 °F to 70 °F and lows from 47 °F to 51 °F. From November through April, St. Augustine often has long periods of rainless weather. April can see near drought conditions with brush fires and water restrictions in place. St. Augustine averages 4.6 frosts per year. The record low of  happened on January 21, 1985. Hurricanes occasionally impact the region; however, like most areas prone to such storms, St. Augustine rarely suffers a direct hit by a major hurricane. The last direct hit by a major hurricane to the city was Hurricane Dora in 1964. Extensive flooding occurred in the downtown area of St. Augustine when Hurricane Matthew passed east of the city in October 2016.

Demographics 

As of the 2020 United States Census, there were 14,329 people and 5,828 households in the city. The racial makeup of the city was 84.6% white, 9.2% African American, 0.2% Native American, 0.5% Asian, 0.1% Pacific Islander, 5.9% Hispanic or Latino, and 4.2% from two or more races. 

2.2% of the population were under 5 years old, 8.7% under 18 years old, and 25.5% were 65 years and over. 57.9% of the population were female. 

There were 1,230 veterans living in the city between 2016-2020 and 6.6% of the population were foreign born persons. 

The median value of owner-occupied housing units was $294,600. The median gross rent was $1,118. 91.2% of households had a computer and 83.0% of households had a broadband internet subscription. 

93.8% of the population 25 years and older had a high school degree or higher and 37.4% of that same population had a Bachelor's degree or higher. 

The median household income was $60,455. The per capita income was $33,060. 17.0% lived below the Poverty threshold.

Government and politics 
St. Augustine is the county seat of St. Johns County, Florida.

The city of St. Augustine operates under a city commission government form with an elected mayor, vice mayor, and city commission. Additionally, the government includes a city manager, city attorney, city clerk, and various city boards.

Transportation

Highways 

  Interstate 95 runs north–south.
  U.S. Route 1 runs north–south.
  State Road A1A runs north–south.
  State Road 16 runs east–west
  State Road 207 runs northeast–southwest
  State Road 312 runs east–west

Buses 
Bus service is operated by the Sunshine Bus Company, based in St. Augustine Beach. Buses operate mainly between shopping centers across town, but a few go to Hastings and Jacksonville, where one can connect to JTA for additional service across Jacksonville.

Airport 

It has three runways and two seaplane lanes. There is currently no scheduled service to the Airport following ViaAir's suspension of service to Charlotte in 2018. Various private jets and tour helicopters also operate from the airport. Northrop Grumman runs a large manufacturing plant on the grounds, where the E-2 Hawkeye is produced. Jacksonville International Airport is 40 miles to the north along I-95.

Points of interest

First and second Spanish eras 
 Avero House
 Castillo de San Marcos National Monument
 Fort Matanzas National Monument
 Fort Mose Historic State Park
 Nombre de Dios
 Gonzalez-Alvarez House
 Fountain of Youth Archaeological Park
 The Spanish Military Hospital Museum
 St. Francis Barracks
 Colonial Quarter
 Ximenez-Fatio House
 González-Jones House
 Llambias House
 Oldest Wooden Schoolhouse
 Tolomato Cemetery and Huguenot Cemetery

British era
 The King's Bakery

Pre-Flagler era
 St. Augustine Lighthouse and Museum
 Markland Mansion

Flagler era
 Ponce de Leon Hotel
 Casa Monica Hotel
 Hotel Alcazar
 Zorayda Castle
 Bridge of Lions
 Old St. Johns County Jail
 Ripley's Believe it or Not! Museum located in 1887 mansion of William Worden.
 St. Augustine Alligator Farm Zoological Park

Historic churches
 Grace United Methodist Church
 Cathedral Basilica of St. Augustine
 Memorial Presbyterian Church
 Trinity Church of St. Augustine

Lincolnville National Historic District – Civil Rights era

 St. Benedict the Moor School

Other points of interest
 Anastasia State Park
 Florida School for the Deaf and Blind
 Great Cross
 St. Augustine Amphitheatre
 St. Augustine Aquarium
 St. Augustine Pirate & Treasure Museum
 Victory III, St. Augustine Scenic Cruise boat, since 1973
 World Golf Hall of Fame

Education

Primary and secondary education in St. Augustine is overseen by the St. Johns County School District.

There are four zoned elementary schools with sections of the city limits in their attendance boundaries: John A. Crookshank (outside the city limits), R. B. Hunt, Ketterlinus, and Osceola (outside the city limits). 
There are two zoned middle schools (both outside the city limits): R. J. Murray Middle School, and Sebastian Middle School. There are no county high schools located within St. Augustine's current city limits, but St. Augustine High School is the designated senior high school for residentially-zoned land in St. Augustine. Additionally Pedro Menendez High School, and St. Johns Technical High School are located in the vicinity.

The Florida School for the Deaf and Blind, a state-operated boarding school for deaf and blind students, was founded in the city in 1885. The Catholic Diocese of St. Augustine operates the St. Joseph Academy, Florida's oldest Catholic high school, to the west of the city.

There are several institutions of higher education in and around St. Augustine. Flagler College is a four-year liberal arts college founded in 1968. It is located in the former Ponce de Leon Hotel in downtown St. Augustine. St. Johns River State College, a state college in the Florida College System, has its St. Augustine campus just west of the city. Also in the area are the University of North Florida, Jacksonville University, and Florida State College at Jacksonville in Jacksonville.

The institution now known as Florida Memorial University was located in St. Augustine from 1918 to 1968, when it relocated to its present campus in Miami. Originally known as Florida Baptist Academy, then Florida Normal, and then Florida Memorial College, it was a historically black institution and had a wide impact on St. Augustine while it was located there. During World War II it was chosen as the site for training the first blacks in the U. S. Signal Corps. Among its faculty members was Zora Neale Hurston; a historic marker is placed at the house where she lived while teaching at Florida Memorial (and where she wrote her autobiography Dust Tracks on a Road.)

Notable people

 Andrew Anderson, physician, St. Augustine mayor
 Jorge Biassou, Haitian revolutionary and black Spanish general
 Richard Boone, actor
 James Branch Cabell, novelist
 Doug Carn, jazz musician
 Ray Charles, pianist, singer, composer
 George J. F. Clarke, Surveyor General of Spanish East Florida
 Nicholas de Concepcion, escaped slave who became a Spanish privateer and pirate captain
 Earl Cunningham, artist
 Alexander Darnes, born a slave, became a well-known physician
 Edmund Jackson Davis, governor of Texas
 Frederick Delius, composer
 Henry Flagler, industrialist
 Michael Gannon, historian
 William H. Gray, U.S. congressman and president of the United Negro College Fund
 Martin Davis Hardin, Union General in the Civil War
 Robert Hayling, civil rights leader
 Martin Johnson Heade, artist
 Zora Neale Hurston, novelist and folklorist
 Stetson Kennedy, author and human rights activist
 Scott Lagasse Jr., race car driver
 Jacob Lawrence, artist
 William W. Loring, Confederate general
 Albert Manucy, historian, author, Fulbright Scholar
 Howell W. Melton, United States district judge
 Prince Achille Murat, nephew of Napoleon Bonaparte
 David Nolan, author and historian
 Osceola, Seminole War leader (held prisoner at Fort Marion, now Castillo de San Marcos)
 Verle A. Pope, state legislator
 Richard Henry Pratt, soldier and educator
 Marjorie Kinnan Rawlings, novelist
 Marcus Roberts, musician
 Gamble Rogers, folk singer
 John M. Schofield, Union general
 Edmund Kirby Smith, Confederate general
 Steve Spurrier, college/pro (American) football coach
 Felix Varela, Cuban national hero
 Augustin Verot, first Bishop of St. Augustine
 DeWitt Webb, physician, St. Augustine mayor, state representative
 David Levy Yulee, first Jewish U.S. Senator, Levy County and Yulee, Florida namesake

Sister cities

St. Augustine's sister cities are:
 Avilés, Spain
 Cartagena, Colombia
 Menorca, Spain
 Santo Domingo, Dominican Republic

Gallery

See also

 Gálveztown (brig sloop) – ship which played a role in the Gulf Coast campaign of the American Revolutionary War under Bernardo de Gálvez, and its replica built recently in Spain anticipating the 450th anniversary of St. Augustine's founding (1565–2015).
 St. Augustine movement

References

Further reading 

 Abbad y Lasierra, Iñigo, "Relación del descubrimiento, conquista y población de las provincias y costas de la Florida" – "Relación de La Florida" (1785); edición de Juan José Nieto Callén y José María Sánchez Molledo.
 Colburn, David, Racial Change and Community Crisis:  St. Augustine, Florida, 1877–1980 (1985), New York:  Columbia University Press.
 
 Deagan, Kathleen, Fort Mose:  Colonial America's Black Fortress of Freedom  (1995), Gainesville:  University Press of Florida.
 Fairbanks, George R. (George Rainsford), History and antiquities of St. Augustine, Florida (1881), Jacksonville, Florida, H. Drew.
 Gannon, Michael V., The Cross in the Sand:  The Early Catholic Church in Florida 1513–1870 (1965), Gainesville: University Presses of Florida.
 Goldstein, Holly Markovitz, "St. Augustine's "Slave Market": A Visual History," Southern Spaces, 28 September 2012.
 Gordon, Elsbeth, Florida's Colonial Architectural Heritage, University Press of Florida, 2002; Heart and Soul of Florida: Sacred Sites and Historic Architecture, University Press of Florida, 2013
 Graham, Thomas, The Awakening of St. Augustine, (1978), St. Augustine Historical Society' Hanna, A. J., A Prince in Their Midst, (1946), Norman:  University of Oklahoma Press.
 Harvey, Karen, America's First City, (1992), Lake Buena Vista, Florida:  Tailored Tours Publications.
 Harvey, Karen, St. Augustine Enters the Twenty-first Century, (2010), Virginia Beach, VA:  The Donning Company.
 Landers, Jane, Black Society in Spanish Florida (1999), Urbana and Chicago:  University of Illinois Press.
 Lardner, Ring,  Gullible's Travels, (1925), New York:  Scribner's.
 Lyon, Eugene, The Enterprise of Florida, (1976), Gainesville:  University Press of Florida.
 Manucy, Albert, Menendez, (1983), St. Augustine Historical Society.
 
 McCarthy, Kevin (editor), The Book Lover's Guide to Florida, (1992), Sarasota, Florida:  Pineapple Press.
 Nolan, David, Fifty Feet in Paradise: The Booming of Florida, (1984), New York:  Harcourt Brace Jovanovich.
 Nolan, David, The Houses of St. Augustine, (1995), Sarasota, Florida: Pineapple Press.
 Porter, Kenneth W., The Black Seminoles:  History of a Freedom-Seeking People, (1996), Gainesville: University Press of Florida.
 Reynolds, Charles B. (Charles Bingham), Old Saint Augustine, a story of three centuries, (1893), St. Augustine, Florida E. H. Reynolds.
 Torchia, Robert W., Lost Colony:  The Artists of St. Augustine, 1930–1950, (2001), St. Augustine:  The Lightner Museum.
 Turner, Glennette Tilley, Fort Mose, (2010), New York:  Abrams Books.
 United States Commission on Civil Rights, 1965. Law Enforcement: A Report on Equal Protection in the South. Washington, D.C.: Government Printing Office.
 Warren, Dan R., If It Takes All Summer:  Martin Luther King, the KKK, and States' Rights in St. Augustine, 1964, (2008), Tuscaloosa: University of Alabama Press.
 Waterbury, Jean Parker (editor), The Oldest City'', (1983), St. Augustine Historical Society.

External links

Government resources
 City of St. Augustine Official Website
 St. Augustine Port, Waterway and Beach District

Local news media
 The St. Augustine Record/staugustine.com, the city's daily print and online newspaper
 Historic City News, daily online news journal

 
1565 establishments in New Spain
Cities in Florida
Cities in the Jacksonville metropolitan area
Cities in St. Johns County, Florida
County seats in Florida
Former colonial and territorial capitals in the United States
Populated coastal places in Florida on the Atlantic Ocean
Populated places established in 1565
Spanish Florida